Pimelea mollis is a species of flowering plant in the family Thymelaeaceae and is endemic to southern Queensland. It is a shrub with hairy young stems, elliptic leaves and heads of 24 to 45 white, tube-shaped flowers.

Description
Both surface of the leaves are sparsely to densely hairy. Flowering has been observed in March and April, and from August to November.

Taxonomy
Pimelea mollis  was first formally described in 2017 by Anthony Bean in the journal Austrobaileya from specimens he collected on the Callide Range near Biloela in 2009. The specific epithet (mollis) means "soft", referring to the hairs on the stems and leaves.

Distribution and habitat
This pimelea is found in southern Queensland between Injune, Biloela and Dingo, where it grows in rainforest and nearby eucalypt forest.

References

mollis
Flora of Queensland
Malvales of Australia
Plants described in 2017
Taxa named by Anthony Bean